Growth differentiation factor 6 (GDF6) is a protein that in humans is encoded by the GDF6 gene.

Function 

GDF6 belongs to the transforming growth factor beta superfamily and may regulate patterning of the ectoderm by interacting with bone morphogenetic proteins, and control eye development.

Growth differentiation factor 6 (GDF6) is a regulatory protein associated with growth and differentiation of developing embryos. GDF6 is encoded by the GDF6 gene. It is a member the transforming growth factor beta superfamily which is a group of proteins involved in early regulation of cell growth and development. GDF6 has been shown to play an important role in the patterning of the epidermis and bone and joint formation. GDF6 induces genes related to the development of the epidermis and can bind directly to noggin, a gene that controls neural development, to block its effect. GDF6 interacts with bone morphogenetic proteins (BMPs) to form heterodimers that may work to regulate neural induction and patterning in developing embryos.  By developing a GDF6 “knockout” model, scientists repressed expression of GDF6 in developing mice embryos. Through this experiment, the scientists were able to directly link GDF6 with several skull and vertebral joint disorders, such as scoliosis and chondrodysplasia, Grebe type.

Clinical significance 

GDF6 is recurrently amplified and specifically expressed in 80% of the melanomas. Patients with less GDF6 had a lower risk of metastasis and a higher chance of survival.  Since GDF6 expression is very low or undetectable in most healthy adult tissues its inhibition could be used to treat this lethal disease.

References

Further reading 

 
 
 
 
 
 
 
 
 
 
 
 
 
 
 
 

Developmental genes and proteins
TGFβ domain